Peter James Forrest (born 15 November 1985) is an Australian former professional cricketer who played for New South Wales, Queensland and Brisbane Heat. He played in 15 One Day Internationals (ODIs) for the Australian national cricket team in 2012.

Domestic career 
With a rookie contract in the 2006–07 season, Forrest made his first-class cricket debut for New South Wales against Queensland on 1 March 2007. After solid performances in early Pura Cup games, outstanding results in the Cricket Australia Cup and consistency for Hawkesbury in Grade Cricket, Forrest received his first full contract for New South Wales ahead of the 2007–08 season.

Forrest made his List A cricket debut against Western Australia on 12 October 2007

In November 2007, Forrest scored his first first-class century against Tasmania at the Sydney Cricket Ground, hitting 177 runs including 21 fours and two sixes.

In February 2010 it was announced that Forrest would be the professional for Lancashire League side Nelson Cricket Club for the 2010 season. Forrest moved from New South Wales to the Queensland Bulls from the 2011–12 Australian season.

International career
In January 2012, Forrest was selected in the 14-man One Day International squad for Australia, to take part in the tri-series against India and Sri Lanka. This came after impressive performances with both Queensland and Brisbane's Big Bash League side the Brisbane Heat, which he captained for the majority of the tournament in injured skipper James Hopes' place.

In February 2012, Forrest made his ODI debut against India at the Adelaide Oval. In his debut innings he scored 66 runs off 83 balls. He hit his second ODI fifty against India on 19 February 2012 at The Gabba, scoring 52 runs off 71 balls. He scored his only One Day international century against Sri Lanka at the Bellerive Oval in Hobart on 24 February 2012.

References

External links
 

1985 births
Living people
New South Wales cricketers
Queensland cricketers
Australian cricketers
Australia One Day International cricketers
Brisbane Heat cricketers
Cricketers from New South Wales